The Leopaard CS9 or Liebao CS9 is a subcompact crossover produced by Changfeng Motor of GAC Group under the Leopaard brand.

Overview

The Leopaard CS9 debuted during the 2017 Beijing Auto Show, and was introduced to the Chinese car market in April 2017 with prices ranging from 76,800 to 129,800 yuan. An electric version called the Leopaard CS9 EV was also available with prices ranging from 195,800 to 205,800 yuan.

The CS9 is powered by a 1.5 liter inline-4 engine producing 113hp or a 1.5 liter inline-4 turbo engine producing 150hp. The 1.5 liter engine comes with a 5-speed manual gearbox, while the 1.5 liter turbo engine is available with either a 6-speed manual gearbox or a continuously variable transmission (CVT).

References

External links

Leopaard CS9 official website
Leopaard CS9 EV official website

Crossover sport utility vehicles
Front-wheel-drive vehicles
Cars introduced in 2017
Changfeng Motor vehicles